Cesar Castro Raval, S.V.D. (December 17, 1924 – January 30, 2017) was a Catholic bishop.

Ordained to the priesthood in 1952, Raval served as auxiliary bishop of the Roman Catholic Diocese of Bangued, Philippines from 1981 to 1988. He then served as diocesan bishop for the Bangued Diocese from 1988 to 1992.

Notes

1924 births
2017 deaths
20th-century Roman Catholic bishops in the Philippines
People from Abra (province)